Les Reports des divers Cases en le Court del Common Bank, en le several Reignes de Hen. VII., Hen. VIII., Edw. VI., et Mar. et Eliz. is a collection of nominate reports, attributed to Gulielme Benloe and Gulielme Dalison, of cases decided by the Court of Common Pleas between approximately 1486 and 1580. For the purpose of citation, their name may be abbreviated to "Ben & D". They are reprinted in volume 123 of the English Reports.

John Bouvier said "Benloe & Dalison's Reports" refers to "Reports and Pleadings in Common Pleas, in the reigns of K. Henry VII., Henry VIII., Edward VI., and Queens Mary and Elizabeth. By William Benloe and William Dalison."

J. G. Marvin said of the abbreviation "Ben & D" of "Benloe and Dalison":

Dalison's Reports
J G Marvin also said, in the same book of 1847:

He also said of the abbreviation "A B" of "Anonymous Benloe":

References
Les Reports des divers Cases en le Court del Common Bank, en le several Reignes de Hen. VII., Hen. VIII., Edw. VI., et Mar. et Eliz. folio. London. 1689.

Sets of reports reprinted in the English Reports
Court of Common Pleas (England)